The thong is a garment generally used as either underwear or in some countries, as a swimsuit. It may also be worn for traditional ceremonies or competitions.

Viewed from the front, the thong typically resembles a bikini bottom, but at the back the material is reduced to a minimum. Thongs are almost always designed to cover the genitals, anus and perineum and leave part or most of the buttocks uncovered. The back of the garment typically consists of a thin waistband and a thin strip of material, designed to be worn between the buttocks, that connects the middle of the waistband with the bottom front of the garment. It is also used as a descriptive term in other types of garment, such as a bodysuit, bodystocking, leotard or one-piece swimsuit, with the meaning "thong-backed".

One type of thong is the G-string, the back of which consists only of a (typically elasticized) string. The two terms G-string and thong are often used interchangeably; however, they can refer to distinct pieces of clothing. Thongs come in a variety of styles depending on the thickness, material or type of the rear portion of fabric and are used by both men and women throughout most of the world.

A tanga is a pair of briefs consisting of small panels connected by strings at the sides. There are tanga briefs both for men and for women. The style and the word come from Brazil.

Nomenclature 
The origin of the word thong in the English language is from Old English þwong, a flexible leather cord.

Many languages borrow the English word string to refer to this type of underwear, usually without the G. Another common name is tanga (or sometimes string tanga), especially in the German Tanga. A frequent metaphor, especially in Brazil, is dental floss; in Brazil a thong is called fio dental (Portuguese for dental floss); in English, the term "Butt floss" is sometimes used. In Lithuanian it is "siaurikės" ("narrows"), in Italian "perizoma" or "tanga", in Turkish "ipli külot" ("stringed underpants"), and in Bulgarian as "prashka", which means a slingshot. In Israel the thong, mostly the G-string, is called Khutini, from the word Khut, which means String. Similarly, in Iran, it is called "Shortbandi" in which "short" (from English: shorts) means "briefs" and "bandi" means "with a string". A Puerto Rican Spanish slang term, used by Reggaeton artists, is gistro.

Some names for the thong make reference to the bareness of the buttocks, such as the Spanish word colaless. (The word's origin is probably connected to the English term "topless" but in reference to cola, a colloquial word meaning "butt" in South American Spanish.) In some other languages the "T"-like shape of the back is emphasised. In Chinese, the thong is commonly called dingziku (丁字褲/丁字裤) which literally means 丁 character pants (or roughly, T-letter pants). In Korean, it is called 티팬티 (T panty). The term "T-back" is sometimes used in English, as in the novel T-Backs, T-Shirts, COAT, and Suit by E. L. Konigsburg.

Thong vs. G-string 
Colloquially, thongs and G-strings are often used interchangeably to describe skimpy underwear with minimal back coverage, although the main difference is usually attributed to the width of the strap in the rear. This is a definition reflected in the Encyclopedia of Clothing and Fashion, which considers the G-string or thong to be a panty with half- to one-inch strip of fabric at the back that goes between the buttocks", using the terms interchangeably. Conversely, Knickers: a Brief History says: "Minor tweaks to the cut earned these skimpy panties different titles—from the thong, which has a one-inch strip of fabric down the back, to a G-string, which, as the name equivalent of Spanish suggests (hilo dental), is more like a string of fabric akin between the teeth." 

Alternatively, some sources have attributed thongs to be a derivation of the G-string, as claimed by Striptease: the Untold History of the Girlie Show. Similarly, the Heinemann English Dictionary describes "thong" as a very skimpy style of undergarment or swimsuit, similar to a G-string. A reverse description is used in Americanisms: the Illustrated Book of Words Made in the USA, which calls the G-string as a type of thong invented in 1936 and attributed to strippers, that consists of a small triangular piece of fabric connected by two elastic straps.

History 
The thong, like its probable predecessor the loincloth, is believed to be one of the earliest forms of human clothing and is also thought to have been worn mostly or exclusively by men. It is thought the thong was probably originally developed to protect, support, or hide the male genitals. The loincloth is probably the earliest form of clothing used by mankind, having originated in the warmer climates of sub-Saharan Africa where clothing was first worn nearly 75,000 years ago. Many tribal peoples, such as some of the Khoisan people of southern Africa, wore thongs for many centuries. Much like the Japanese fundoshi, these early garments were made with the male genitalia in mind.

According to some fashion historians, the first public appearance of the thong in the United States was at the 1939 New York World's Fair. This resulted from Fiorello LaGuardia, the Mayor of New York City, ordering the city's nude dancers to cover themselves. Jacques Heim's and Louis Réard's original bikini from 1946 (that introduced the term bikini) had a culotte with a thong back. Fashion designer Rudi Gernreich, who in the mid-1960s created the first topless swimsuit, which he called the monokini, is credited with introducing the modern thong in 1974 when he designed a thong bikini in response to a ban on nude sunbathing by the Los Angeles City Council.

Attitudes toward the wearing of g-strings vary geographically and across societies, as is usual with highly revealing clothing. Prior to its entrance into mainstream fashion, g-strings were primarily worn by exotic dancers. In the modern Western world, g-strings are more commonly marketed towards females but are worn by both sexes. During the 1980s, thongs were worn on stage by pop stars such as Cher and Madonna. By the 1980s, the style (for females) had made its way into most of the Western world; thong swimwear became even more popular through the 1980s due to TV shows such as Baywatch, in which numerous women were recorded wearing thong swimsuits.

In the 1990s, the thong gained wider popularity in the United States as underwear and as swimwear, especially with women, but also men. In the US and Europe, the wearing of thongs by men was once mainly limited to the dance belt, the posing pouch for bodybuilders and the realm of male strippers. Men's thongs are now more widely available and commonly worn as day-to-day underwear or swimwear, with major retailers such as Kmart and popular fashion brands such as Calvin Klein selling men's thongs. Thongs are not marketed as strongly to men as they are to women; however, in Europe, thongs have been commonplace for many more years both as underwear and swimwear.

In the 2000s, some people wore thongs with low-cut hipsters and deliberately exposed them over the top of their trousers, producing an effect popularly known as a whale tail. This led to many thong designs intended to be worn in this manner, which were adorned with jewels and motifs on the back. In the early-2000s, thongs made up 31% of the women's underwear market. However, in the late-2000s, the exposure of a thong above one's trousers became less popular and the trend turned to the wearing of lower-riding thongs that hardly show above trousers, except when bending or twisting.

Market research in 2011 placed the number of French women who wear thongs as their preferred underwear style at 25%, down by 5% from 2008. By 2016, sales of thongs in the UK were on the decline with Marks & Spencer, a major UK lingerie retailer, reporting that they made up fewer than 10% of knickers sold. In 2022, women's thong sales saw a surge compared to previous years, in part due to a revival of the 2000s trend of the exposed thong popular between Gen Z wearers. The men's thongs also saw renewed interest in part also due to the rising popularity of lingerie for men, with major producers and traditional lingerie makers introducing new products catered to men. Many reasons exist as to why people may choose to wear thong underwear or swimwear, such as prevention of visible panty lines, prevention of underwear "riding up" so one need not pull at one's underwear in public, comfort, fashion consciousness including the feeling of being more adult, and minimization of tan lines.

Design and variety 

Types of thongs include the traditional thong, the G-string, and the C-string. There are a number of intermediate kinds of thongs between full rear coverage and a string rear. As designs become more risqué, there are also types intended to expose genitals as much as they conceal them. Other styles include the Cheeky, V-string, T-front and T-back. The naming of the intermediate styles of thong is debatable, different vendors use the words somewhat interchangeably. Thongs are available in a wide variety of materials, including silk, latex, cotton, microfiber, satin, nylon, lycra/spandex, and lace. There are also novelty designs for both sexes, featuring shapes to conform to the genitals or provide humorous visual effects.

The most significant difference between thongs designed for men and women is the shape of the front part of the garment. Often, but not always, thongs for men will feature a vertical seam to create shape and space for the male genitalia, and the pouch may be made of stretchy material (usually cotton-Lycra or microfiber) for an ergonomic fit. The equivalent section in women's thongs is normally flat and seamless. However, the fabric is usually thicker in the area where it covers the vulva (by incorporating a cotton gusset).

G-string

The V or G-string style consists of an elastic string (also a narrow piece of cloth, leather, or plastic) that connects the front/pouch and the waistband at back, worn as swimwear or underwear by women and men. Since the mid-1920s, strippers and exotic dancers in the West have been referring to the style of thongs they wore for their performances as G-strings. A g-string may be worn in preference to briefs for avoiding a visible panty line, or to enhance sex-appeal.

Etymology
The origin of the term G-string is obscure. It may simply stand for 'Gusset' as the G-String is in effect just a gusset on a string. Since the 19th century, the term geestring referred to the string which held the loincloth of American Indians and later referred to the narrow loincloth itself. William Safire in his Ode on a G-String quoted the usage of the word G-string for loincloth by Harper's Magazine 15 years after Beadle's and suggested that the magazine confused the word with the musical term G string (i.e., the string for the G note). Safire also mentions the opinion of linguist Robert Hendrickson that "G" (or "gee") stands for groin, which was a taboo word at the time.

History
The G-string first appeared in costumes worn by showgirls in Earl Carroll's productions during the Jazz Age. Linguist Robert Hendrickson believes that the g stands for groin. The Oxford English Dictionary reports that the G-string was originally a narrow strip of fabric worn by Indian women. During the Depression, a "G-string" was known as "the gadget". During the 1930s, the "Chicago G-string" gained prominence when worn by performers like Margie Hart. The Chicago area was the home of some of the largest manufacturers of G-strings and it also became the center of the burlesque shows in the United States. In the Tarzan novels of Edgar Rice Burroughs, Tarzan is described as wearing a G-string made of doe or leopard skin.

Other variants of women's thongs

Other variants of men's thongs

Controversy 

As thongs pass between the buttocks and, in women, may be in close contact with the anus and labia, concerns have been raised that they may become damp and act as a conduit for germ transfer, increasing the probability that the wearer may develop urinary tract infections, such as cystitis. However, research suggests that wearing thong underwear does not have a statistically significant effect on the occurrence of bacterial vaginosis or yeast infection.

In 2002, a female high school vice principal in San Diego, California, physically checked up to 100 female students' underwear as they entered the school for a dance, with or without student permission, causing an uproar among students and some parents and eliciting an investigation by the school into the vice principal's conduct. In her defense, the vice principal said the checks were for student safety and not specifically because of the wearing of thongs.

The sale of thongs for girls aged 10–16 by US retailer Abercrombie & Fitch led to an email and telephone campaign against the company. British retailer Argos was criticized for selling G-strings for girls aged nine, and a primary school head teacher in Britain voiced concerns that pupils aged 10–11 were wearing thong underwear to school.

Thong swimsuits are banned or strongly discouraged in some places, including some Muslim countries. Areas in the United States with similar bans include such locations as Myrtle Beach, South Carolina, and Kure Beach, North Carolina.

See also 

 Sportswear
 Thong Song

References

External links 

20th-century fashion
21st-century fashion
Lingerie 
Swimsuits 
1990s fads and trends
Minimalist clothing